Bédjondo is a sub-prefecture in Chad.

References 

Populated places in Chad